Nezu may refer to:

Nezu Shrine, a Shinto shrine in Tokyo, Japan
Nezu Station, a railway station in Tokyo
Nezu (My Hero Academia), a character in the manga series My Hero Academia
Nezu, a character in the manga series Akira

People with the surname
, Japanese actor
, Japanese businessman, politician and philanthropist

See also
Nezu Museum, a museum in Tokyo

Japanese-language surnames